Nicholas Szécsi de Felsőlendva (Széchy; ; c. 1320 – c. June or July 1387) was a Hungarian nobleman from the influential House of Szécsi.

Son of Peter, Count of Nógrád, and Sebe Debrői. He married Margaret of Debrecen, they had four children. He was sent to Poland by King Louis I in 1345, when the Czechs laid siege to Kraków. Between 1346 and 1349, he served as the ban of Croatia.
He took part in the King's second Neapolitan campaign, as well as in the unsuccessful 1352 campaign against the Lithuanian pagans, where he himself was wounded. Upon his return in 1354, he was made supreme count of Krassó.

Between 1358 and 1366 he served as ban of Croatia again, after which he served as the ban of Slavonia between 1366 and 1368.

Szécsi followed the King to Rome in 1370. He was named the ban of Croatia again between 1377 and 1380. He was also the ispán of Vas and of Pozsony between 1381 and 1382.
He served as judge royal three times and finished his career as palatine during the reign of Louis I's daughter Mary.

Sources
  Engel, Pál (1996). Magyarország világi archontológiája, 1301–1457, I. ("Secular Archontology of Hungary, 1301–1457, Volume I"). História, MTA Történettudományi Intézete. Budapest. .
  Markó, László: A magyar állam főméltóságai Szent Istvántól napjainkig – Életrajzi Lexikon p. 253. (The High Officers of the Hungarian State from Saint Stephen to the Present Days – A Biographical Encyclopedia) (2nd edition); Helikon Kiadó Kft., 2006, Budapest; .

1320 births
1387 deaths
Hungarian nobility
Palatines of Hungary
Judges royal
Bans of Croatia
Nicholas 1
Bans of Slavonia
14th-century Hungarian people
Bans of Severin
Masters of the stewards